Rebel is an American legal comedy-drama television series inspired by the life of Erin Brockovich, created by Krista Vernoff, that premiered on ABC on April 8, 2021 and concluded on June 10, 2021. In May 2021, the series was canceled after one season.

Cast and characters

Main

 Katey Sagal as Annie "Rebel" Bello 
 John Corbett as Grady Bello, Rebel's third husband who is divorcing her
 Lex Scott Davis as Cassidy, a lawyer and Rebel's daughter with her second husband, Benji
 Tamala Jones as Lana, a private investigator and Rebel's best friend and former sister-in-law. She's Benji's sister and Cassidy's aunt.
 James Lesure as Benji, Rebel's second ex-husband and Cassidy's father
 Kevin Zegers as Nate, a doctor and Rebel's son with her first husband, Woodrow
 Sam Palladio as Luke, an attorney and a junior associate at Benji's law firm
 Ariela Barer as Ziggy, Rebel's and Grady's adopted daughter. She is a recovering addict with Lana as her sponsor. 
 Andy Garcia as Julian Cruz, Rebel's boss who lost his wife after she received the Stonemore heart valve

Special guest star
 Mary McDonnell as Helen Peterson

Recurring

 Matthew Glave as Woodrow Flynn, a police officer who is Rebel's first ex-husband and Nate's father
 Mo McRae as Amir
 Jalen Thomas Brooks as Sean
 Adam Arkin as Mark Duncan
 Dan Bucatinsky as Jason Erickson
 Abigail Spencer as Dr. Misha Nelson

Episodes

Production

Development
On October 31, 2019, Rebel was given a put pilot commitment by ABC. On January 23, 2020, it was given a pilot order. On September 16, 2020, ABC gave the production a series order. The pilot is written by Krista Vernoff and directed by Tara Nicole Weyr. The series is created by Vernoff who was expected to executive produce alongside Erin Brockovich, John Davis, John Fox, Andrew Stearn and Alexandre Schmitt. Production companies involved with the series were slated to consist of Davis Entertainment, ABC Signature, and Sony Pictures Television. On January 25, 2021, Marc Webb and Adam Arkin were added as executive producers. On May 14, 2021, ABC canceled the series after one season. On July 15, 2021, it was reported that the series entered negotiations to relocate on IMDb TV for a potential second season. A month later, the series creator Vernoff announced that plans for a second season were scrapped.

Casting
Upon pilot order announcement, Katey Sagal was cast to star. In February 2020, John Corbett, James Lesure, Tamala Jones, and Ariela Barer joined the main cast. In March 2020, Andy Garcia and Lex Scott Davis were cast in starring roles. On September 20, 2020, Kevin Zegers and Sam Palladio joined cast as lead opposites of Segal. On January 25, 2021, Dan Bucatinsky was cast in a recurring capacities. On February 9, 2021, Mary McDonnell, Adam Arkin, Matthew Glave, and Jalen Thomas Brooks joined the cast in recurring roles. On February 25, 2021, Abigail Spencer joined the cast in a recurring role.

Filming
The series began filming on December 2, 2020, in Los Angeles, California.

Release
The series premiered on April 8, 2021, on ABC. Rebel aired in Canada on CTV, simulcast with ABC in the United States. Internationally, the series premiered on Disney+ under the dedicated streaming hub Star as an original series, on May 28, 2021. In Latin America, the series premieres as a Star+ original.

Reception

Critical response
On Rotten Tomatoes, the series holds an approval rating of 38% based on 8 critic reviews, with an average rating of 6/10. Metacritic gave the series a weighted average score of 57 out of 100 based on 7 critic reviews, indicating "mixed or average reviews".

Ratings

Accolades

References

External links
 
 

2020s American comedy-drama television series
2020s American legal television series
2021 American television series debuts
2021 American television series endings
American Broadcasting Company original programming
English-language television shows
Television series by ABC Studios
Television series by Sony Pictures Television
Television shows filmed in Los Angeles
Television shows set in Los Angeles County, California